The 2009 Asian Women's Junior Handball Championship (10th tournament) took place in Bangkok from 13 August–18 August. It acts as the Asian qualifying tournament for the 2010 Women's Junior World Handball Championship.

Results

Final standing

References
www.handball.jp (Archived 2009-09-05)

External links
www.asianhandball.com

International handball competitions hosted by Thailand
Asian Women's Junior Handball Championship, 2009
Asia
Asian Handball Championships